Dravida Brahmins (or simply Dravidulu) is a sub-caste of the Telugu Brahmins of Andhra Pradesh in South India, who migrated from Tamil Nadu in history.

Origin
During the reign of Rajaraja Narendra a few of Tamil Brahmin families settled in different parts of Andhra Pradesh. These Tamil Brahmins who had settled in the Andhra Pradesh are known as the Dravida Brahmins.

Classification
They fall under the 
Pancha Dravida Brahmin classification of the Brahmin community in India. Dravida Brahmins are divided into several sub-sects, which are named after the places in which they have settled such Aaraama Dravidulu, Pudur Dravidulu, Konaseema Dravidulu, Peruru Dravidulu, Tummagunta Dravidulu and Dimili Dravidulu.

See also 
 Forward Castes
 Iyer

References 

Telugu Brahmin communities
Social groups of Andhra Pradesh